Planetoids is a clone of Atari, Inc.'s Asteroids arcade game published by Adventure International for the Apple II in 1980 and TRS-80 in 1981. Each was originally an independently sold game, neither of which was titled Planetoids. The Apple II version, written by Marc Goodman, was published as Asteroid. The TRS-80 game was written by Greg Hassett as Fasteroids by Adventure Works. Fasteroids was still sold by Adventure Works at the same time Planetoids was available through Adventure International. The TRS-80 version includes features not present on the Apple II or arcade original.

Gameplay
Planetoids is a version of the 1979 arcade game, Asteroids. The TRS-80 adaptation includes three additional modes: high-speed asteroids, very slow moving asteroids, and a dogfight with only enemy ships.

Reception
Ian Chadwick reviewed Planetoids in Ares magazine #11 and commented that "it's enjoyable and [...] well done. It's a must for fans of the arcade game". In 80-U.S. magazine, Bob Liddil called Fasteroids, "Asteroids with GUSTO" and called out the ability to save high scores to tape and the pause feature as positives.

References

External links
Review in Byte
Review in Creative Computing

1980 video games
Adventure International games
Apple II games
Multidirectional shooters
TRS-80 games
Video game clones
Video games developed in the United States
Video games set in outer space